Center of the World is an album by the Frank Wright Quartet, consisting of saxophonist Frank Wright, pianist Bobby Few, bassist Alan Silva and drummer Muhammad Ali. It was recorded live in 1972 and released on the French Center of the World label.
The album was reissued on CD in 1999 by Fractal with two previously unreleased performances from a 1978 reunion.

Reception

In his review for AllMusic, Thom Jurek states "While Wright is the leader of the ensemble and was capable of blowing the hell out of his horn, the true star on these sessions is Few, who joined Steve Lacy's Sextet upon departure from this group."

Track listing
 "Center of the World, Part 1" (Wright, Silva, Few) –  19:51  
 "Center of the World, Part 2" (Wright, Silva, Few) –  19:45

Bonus tracks on Fractal reissue CD
Recorded live 1978 at Neue Anta, Detmold
"No End" (Wright) –  17:32
"Church Number 9" (Wright) –  13:11

Personnel

Frank Wright – tenor saxophone, soprano sax, voice
Bobby Few – piano, voice
Alan Silva – bass, cello, voice
Muhammad Ali – drums, voice

References

1972 live albums
Frank Wright (jazz musician) live albums